Royal Ordnance Factories (ROFs) was the collective name of the UK government's munitions factories during and after the Second World War. Until privatisation, in 1987, they were the responsibility of the Ministry of Supply, and later the Ministry of Defence.

Origin
Prior to the 1930s, Britain's ordnance manufacturing capability had been concentrated within the Royal Arsenal, Woolwich. In the late nineteenth century, the term 'Royal Ordnance Factories' began to be used collectively of the manufacturing departments of the Arsenal (principally the Royal Laboratory, Royal Gun Factory and Royal Carriage Works) which, though they shared the same site, operated independently of one another. This use of the term is seen in the name of the Royal Ordnance Factories Football Club (founded 1893) and it continued through the First World War. The emerging threat of aerial bombing, however, prompted the government to consider dispersing its ordnance factories around the country.

Development
The majority of the ROFs were built during the re-armament period, just before the start of the Second World War, to enhance the capacity of the three ordnance sites that had continued in operation after the end of the First World War: the Royal Arsenal, Woolwich, the Royal Gunpowder Factory (RGPF) Waltham Abbey, Essex and the Royal Small Arms Factory, (RSAF) Enfield. These three sites were in or near London and were considered to be vulnerable to aerial bombing from continental Europe.

The Royal Arsenal designed many of the ROFs and was also the agent for the construction of all of the Rifles ROFs, the Medium Machine ROF and the Small Arms Ammunition ROFs. The Ministry of Supply, the Ministry of Works, and two other private companies were agents for the construction of the remaining ROFs.

Other Second World War explosive factories
A number of Second World War munitions factories were built, and owned, by Imperial Chemical Industries (ICI). These ICI Nobel Explosives owned factories were not considered part of the Ministry of Supply's Royal Ordnance Factory organization, and they were not called ROFs. ICI also managed munitions factories constructed with Ministry of Supply funding. These were known as "agency factories" and three of them became part of Royal Ordnance upon the ROFs' privatisation.

Agency factories
Some of the ROF filling factories built later, during the Second World War, were government-owned, but managed, as agency factories, by private companies unconnected with the explosives industry. For example, Joseph Lyons & Co ran ROF Elstow throughout the war. Other filling factories were run by Imperial Tobacco, Courtaulds, the Co-operative Wholesale Society (CWS), Metal Closures and Lever Brothers.

Siting of the ROFs 
The new ROFs were to be built in areas regarded as "relatively safe". Until 1940, this meant from Bristol, in the south, and then west of a line that ran from (roughly) Weston-super-Mare, in Somerset, northwards to Haltwhistle, Northumberland; and then northwestwards to Linlithgow, in Scotland. The South, South East and East of England were regarded as "dangerous" and the Midlands area, including Birmingham as "unsafe". This definition of "safe" area was later changed, and in 1940 ignored in the case of ROF Chorley.

Siting of the individual ROFs north and west of this line was of vital importance. ROFs involved with explosive manufacture or filling needed, on safety grounds, to be located away from centres of population. However, they needed access to good transport links, such as railways; the availability of adequate workers within reasonable travelling distance; a plentiful guaranteed supply of clean process water; and (to avoid the danger of frozen explosives) tended to be located at or just above sea level. Some ROFs located in Wales and Scotland were the result of political lobbying as these areas had high unemployment rates in the 1930s. The ROFs were guarded by what was to become the Ministry of Defence Police.

Responsibilities and functions 

The Royal Ordnance Factories were set up with six generic types of factories:
 Engineering ROFs;
 Explosive ROFs;
 Filling factories, including small arms ammunition (SAA) filling factories;
 Medium Machine Shops, specifically ROF Patricroft;
 Rifles ROFs, specifically ROF Fazakerley and ROF Maltby; and,
 Small arms ammunition (SAA) factories.

The three main types were: engineering, filling and explosives.

The largest ROFs tended to be the explosive ROFs and the filling factories as these needed an explosives safeguarding zone around the perimeter of the factory; as well as separation, or reduced separation and traverses, between buildings.

Management of the ROFs 
Each ROF tended to be self-contained, apart from its raw materials: with their own coal-fired power stations, for generating steam for heating and process use, and electricity via high-pressure steam turbines if needed; engineering workshops; plumbers and chemical plumbers; leather workers; electricians; buildings and works departments; housing and hostels for workers; canteens; laundries and medical centres.

The UK's ROFs were set up and operated as production factories. The design of explosives, propellants and munitions was carried out at separate government-owned research and development establishments such as the Research Department, which was initially based at the Royal Arsenal, Woolwich and then Fort Halstead, in Sevenoaks, Kent; and at PERME Waltham Abbey, Essex, which later moved to become RARDE Fort Halstead.

Post-war history

Closures of temporary ROFs 

A number of the ROFs were designated temporary, for use during the war's duration only. They closed shortly after the end of the Second World War. Other ROFs were designated permanent and they remained open into more recent times. In 1957, a Defence white paper led to a reorganisation of the aircraft industry, a restructuring of the British Army and a concentration on missile systems. A number of the permanent ROFs closed in the late 1950s, after the end of the Korean War, and others closed in the 1970s. The largest of these, based at the Royal Arsenal in Woolwich, formally closed on 31 March 1967.

The temporary ROFs, or ROFs which closed in the 1950s and 1970s, tended to be taken over by other government departments. Some closed ROFs and Admiralty explosive sites, such as the Royal Navy Propellant Factory, Caerwent, were retained by the Ministry of Defence as ammunition storage areas; others became government industrial estates or trading estates; others were used as brownfield sites to build prisons or open prisons.

Part of ROF Thorp Arch became the Boston Spa depository of the British Library. Three of the seven hostels that served ROF Swynnerton became a training school for General Post Office (GPO) Telephones, which later became British Telecom, and is now the Yarnfield Park Training and Conference Centre and run by Accenture. ROF Elstow was taken over by the CEGB and became a storage depot. The site has been cleared; and, as of 2008, is in the process of becoming the new town of Wixams.

Trading fund 
In July 1974, the Royal Ordnance Factories were set up as a trading fund, under the Government Trading Funds Act 1973.

Privatisation of the remaining ROFs

As part of its privatisation process in the 1980s, the UK government transferred some of the, formerly separate, research and development capability of the Defence Research Establishments into the ROFs. Other parts of the UK's defence research and design capability were later closed down; remained with the UK Ministry of Defence, as Dstl; or became part of QinetiQ.

On 2 January 1985 the majority of the Royal Ordnance Factories were vested in the UK government-owned company Royal Ordnance plc; it was bought by British Aerospace in 1987. The Ministry of Defence Police left most of the ROFs on or within a few years of privatisation.

The small number of ROFs involved in nuclear weapons production, ROF Burghfield and ROF Cardiff, were removed from ROF management and did not pass over to Royal Ordnance upon privatisation. They were transferred to the control of AWRE; which later became the Atomic Weapons Establishment.

See also
Filling factories
List of prisons in the United Kingdom
List of Royal Ordnance Factories
Royal Arsenal
Royal Small Arms Factory
Waltham Abbey Royal Gunpowder Mills
Ruddington Depot

References

References

Bibliography 
 Bates, H. E. (n/d). The Tinkers of Elstow: The story of the Royal Ordnance Factory managed by J. Lyons & Company Limited for the Ministry of Supply during the World War of 1939–1945. London: n/p.
 Bowditch, M.R. & Hayward, L. (1996). A Pictorial Record of the Royal Naval Cordite Factory, Holton Health. Warham: Finial Publishing. .
 Hay, Ian. (1949). R.O.F.: The Story of the Royal Ordnance Factories: 1939 – 48. London: His Majesty's Stationery Office.
 Hornby, William. (1958). Factories and Plant: (History of the Second World War: United Kingdom Civil Series). London: Her Majesty's Stationery Office and Longmans, Green and Co.
 Kohan, C.M. (1952). Works and Buildings: (History of the Second World War: United Kingdom Civil Series). London: Her Majesty's Stationery Office and Longmans, Green and Co.
 Nevell, Mike, Roberts, John & Smith, Jack. (1999). A History of Royal Ordnance Factory, Chorley. Trowbridge: Carnegie Publishing. .

Explosives manufacturers

 
Former nationalised industries of the United Kingdom